Maurice Buffière (6 March 1934 – 28 June 2021) was a French basketball player. He competed in the men's tournament at the 1956 Summer Olympics.

References

External links
 

1934 births
2021 deaths
French men's basketball players
Olympic basketball players of France
Basketball players at the 1956 Summer Olympics
Place of birth missing